White River Glacier is located in the Glacier Peak Wilderness in the U.S. state of Washington. The glacier is within Wenatchee National Forest and nearly touches Honeycomb and Suiattle Glaciers, separated from them by an arête off the Kololo Peaks at its uppermost reaches. White River Glacier has retreated approximately  since the end of the Little Ice Age around the year 1850.

See also
List of glaciers in the United States

References

Glaciers of Glacier Peak
Glaciers of Washington (state)